Epipristis roseus is a moth of the family Geometridae. It is found in China (Inner Mongolia).

The  length of the forewings is 13.5–14.5 mm for males and 15–16 mm for females. The wings are pale brown to greyish brown, diffused with blackish and pinkish scales.

Etymology
The specific name is derived from the Latin word roseus (meaning pink).

References

Moths described in 2009
Pseudoterpnini